Bozoğlu is a village in the Çerkeş District of Çankırı Province in Turkey. Its population is 147 (2021).

References

Villages in Çerkeş District